The Super Coppa Sammarinese (English: San Marino Super Cup) is an annual association football match in San Marino between the winners of the Campionato Sammarinese di Calcio and the Coppa Titano. The fixture is recognised as a Super cup.

The competition was first contested in the 2012/13 season after the tournament replaced the Trofeo Federale as the super cup of San Marino.

Matches

Performance by club

References

External links
San Marino - List of Cup Winners, RSSSF.com

 
San Marino
Supercup
2012 establishments in San Marino
Recurring sporting events established in 2012